J. Harry Woods (birth unknown – death unknown) was an English professional rugby league footballer who played in the 1930s.

Background
Harry Woods was born in Leigh, Lancashire, England.

Playing career

International honours
Harry Woods, won caps for England while at Liverpool Stanley in 1935 against France, and Wales, while at Leeds in 1937 against France, and won caps for Great Britain while at Liverpool Stanley in 1936 against Australia (3 matches), and New Zealand (2 matches), and while at Leeds in 1937 against Australia.

County honours
Harry Woods played right-, i.e. number 12, in Lancashire's 7-5 victory over Australia in the 1937–38 Kangaroo tour of Great Britain and France match at Wilderspool Stadium, Warrington on Wednesday 29 September 1937, in front of a crowd of 16,250.

County Cup Final appearances
Harry Woods played left-, i.e. number 8, in Leeds' 14-8 victory over Huddersfield in the 1937–38 Yorkshire County Cup Final during the 1937–38 season at Belle Vue, Wakefield on Saturday 30 October 1937.

References

External links
Statistics at wigan.rlfans.com

England national rugby league team players
English rugby league players
Great Britain national rugby league team players
Lancashire rugby league team players
Leeds Rhinos players
Leigh Leopards captains
Leigh Leopards players
Liverpool City (rugby league) players
Place of death missing
Rugby league players from Leigh, Greater Manchester
Rugby league props
Rugby league second-rows
Wigan Warriors players
Year of birth missing
Year of death missing